Viktor Ekbom (born 1 June 1989) is a Swedish former professional ice hockey defenseman who played in the Swedish Hockey League (SHL).

Playing career
Ekbom was selected by the Pittsburgh Penguins in the 6th round (181st overall) of the 2009 NHL Entry Draft.

He started the 2010–11 season with Linköpings HC in the Elitserien, and finished the remainder of the season on an amateur try-out with the Wilkes-Barre/Scranton Penguins, the AHL affiliate of the Pittsburgh Penguins. Ekbom went scoreless in three games. Before signing a try-out in North America, Ekbom was signed to a two-year contract starting from the 2011–12 season with Finnish club Tappara of the SM-liiga on 25 March 2011.

His rights were relinquished by the Penguins on 31 May 2011, making him eligible to re-enter the 2011 NHL Entry Draft.

On 15 June 2012, Ekbom left Tappara to sign a one-year contract with EHC München of the German DEL. During the 2012–13 season, Ekbom contributed with 4 goals and 10 points in 38 games for Munchen.

On 1 May 2013, upon completion of his contract with EHC München Ekbom returned to his native Sweden and signed a one-year deal with Örebro HK of the SHL.

Following completion of the 2021–22 season, his fourth with Frölunda HC, Ekbom announced his retirement from professional hockey on 12 July 2022.

Career statistics

Regular season and playoffs

International

Awards and honours

References

External links

1989 births
Frölunda HC players
Linköping HC players
Living people
EHC München players
Örebro HK players
IK Oskarshamn players
People from Falköping Municipality
Pittsburgh Penguins draft picks
Swedish ice hockey defencemen
Tappara players
Wilkes-Barre/Scranton Penguins players
Sportspeople from Västra Götaland County